The 38th People's Choice Awards, honoring the best in popular culture for 2011, were held on January 11, 2012 at the Nokia Theatre in Los Angeles, California, and were broadcast live on CBS at 9:00 pm ET.

Katy Perry Dominated the 38th People's Choice Awards by winning the most awards, winning five out of seven nominations, including Favorite Female Artist. Harry Potter and the Deathly Hallows – Part 2 won four awards, including Favorite Movie. How I Met Your Mother won three awards, including Favorite TV Comedy, Emma Stone won two awards, including Favorite Movie Actress. Supernatural also won two awards, including Favorite Network TV Drama.

On November 8, 2011, the nominees were announced. The film Harry Potter and the Deathly Hallows – Part 2 received the most nominations this year with nine. The TV series Glee and singer Katy Perry each received seven nominations.

Performances
Demi Lovato - "Give Your Heart a Break"
Faith Hill - "Come Home"

Nominees
Winners are listed in bold.

Movies

Television

Music

References

People's Choice Awards
2011 awards in the United States
2012 in American television
2012 in California